Eupithecia perendina is a moth in the family Geometridae. It is found in China (Yunnan).

References

Moths described in 1980
perendina
Moths of Asia